The 1954 FIFA World Cup was the fifth edition of the FIFA World Cup, the quadrennial international football tournament for senior men's national teams of the nations affiliated to FIFA. It was held in Switzerland from 16 June to 4 July. Switzerland was selected as the host country in July 1946. At the tournament several all-time records for goal-scoring were set, including the highest average number of goals scored per game. The tournament was won by West Germany, who defeated tournament favourites Hungary 3–2 in the final, their first World Cup title.

Host selection
Switzerland was awarded the tournament unopposed at a meeting in Luxembourg City on 22 July 1946, the same day Brazil was selected to host the 1950 World Cup.

Qualification

The hosts (Switzerland) and the defending champions (Uruguay) qualified automatically. Of the remaining 14 places, 11 were allocated to Europe (including Egypt, Turkey, and Israel), two to the Americas, and one to Asia.

Scotland, Turkey, and South Korea made their World Cup debuts at this tournament (Turkey and Scotland had qualified for the 1950 competition but both withdrew). South Korea became the first independent Asian country to participate in a World Cup tournament. Austria appeared following a hiatus from 1934. South Korea did not appear at a World Cup finals again until 1986, while Turkey's next appearance was not until 2002. Several teams, such as Hungary and Czechoslovakia (the pre-war World Cups' runners-up) were back into the tournament after missing out the 1950 World Cup.

The teams that finished third and fourth in 1950, Sweden and Spain, both failed to qualify. Spain was eliminated by Turkey; the two countries finished level on points in their qualifying group, and then drew their neutral play-off, which led to the drawing of lots by a blindfolded Italian boy, who picked Turkey to progress.

German teams as well as Japan were allowed to qualify again, after having been banned from the 1950 FIFA World Cup. West Germany qualified against fellow Germans from the Saarland (which then was a French protectorate), while East Germany did not enter, having cancelled international football matches after the East German uprising of 1953. Japan failed to qualify, having finished below South Korea in their qualifying group. Argentina declined to participate for the third successive World Cup.

List of qualified teams
The following 16 teams qualified for the final tournament.

 
 
 
 
 
 
 
 
 
 
 
  (hosts)
 
  (1950 champions)

Summary

Format

Group stage
The 1954 tournament used a unique format. The sixteen qualifying teams were divided into four groups of four teams each. Each group contained two seeded teams and two unseeded teams. Only four matches were scheduled for each group, each pitting a seeded team against an unseeded team. This contrasts with the usual round-robin in which every team plays every other team: six matches in each group. Another oddity was that extra time, which in most tournaments is not employed at the group stage, was played in the group games if the score was level after 90 minutes, with the result being a draw if the scores were still level after 120 minutes.

Two points were awarded for a win and one for a draw. The two teams with the most points from each group progressed to the knockout stage. In the case of a tie between two teams for second place, the two tied teams competed in a play-off to decide which team would progress to the next stage, with extra time and drawing of lots if necessary. Had all four teams in a group been tied on points, there would have been two further play-offs – one play-off between the two seeded teams, and the other between the two unseeded teams, again with extra time and drawing of lots if necessary – with the winner of each play-off progressing to the quarter-finals.

Two of the four groups ended up requiring play-offs – one between Switzerland and Italy, and the other between Turkey and West Germany. In each match, the unseeded team (Switzerland and West Germany) repeated an earlier victory against the seeded team (Italy and Turkey) to progress. The fact that two group matches were played twice, while other group opponents never faced each other at all, attracted criticism; newly elected FIFA President Rodolphe Seeldrayers declared that this group format would be abandoned in future world cups.

Quarter-finals
For each of the first two quarter-finals, one team progressing from group 1 was drawn against one team progressing from group 2. For the remaining two quarter-finals, this procedure was repeated for groups 3 and 4. Before the tournament, it was stated that in the event of a quarter-final being tied after 90 minutes, 30 minutes of extra time would be played, followed by drawing of lots if necessary. Later, it was stated that a quarter-final could be replayed in this situation. The draw was scheduled to be held on Sunday 20 June, though in fact it was delayed into the early morning of Monday 21 June.

Semi-finals

For the semi-finals, a further draw was held, with each semi-final featuring one team from groups 1–2 against one team from groups 3–4. In the event of a semi-final being tied after extra time, it would be replayed once, followed by drawing of lots if necessary.

The draw for the semi-finals, held on Sunday 27 June, was delayed by a complaint from the Hungarian team concerning the manner in which their quarter-final against Brazil had been played.

Final

The final would be replayed if scores were level after extra-time. If the replay was also tied, the winner would be decided by the tournament organising committee, or by drawing of lots.

Seeding
Before qualification was complete, the eight seeded teams were determined by FIFA. They were Austria, Brazil, England, France, Hungary, Italy, Spain, and Uruguay.

These seedings were thrown into disarray when, in an unexpected result, Turkey eliminated Spain in qualification. FIFA resolved this situation by giving Turkey the seeding that had previously been allocated to Spain.

Notable results
West Germany, who had been reinstated as full FIFA members in 1950 and were unseeded, convincingly won the first of two encounters with the seeded Turkish side at Wankdorf stadium in Berne. The South Koreans, the other unseeded team, lost 7–0 and 9–0, with West Germany being denied the chance to play such an easy opponent. Sepp Herberger, the West German coach, gambled against the seeded team of Hungary by sending in a reserve side, and lost 8–3; so they had to play off against Turkey, a match that West Germany easily won.

Hungary's team captain Ferenc Puskás, considered by many as the best player in the world in that time, was injured by West German defender Werner Liebrich, and had to miss Hungary's next two matches. Puskás played for Hungary in the final, despite still being in a questionable condition.

In the quarter-finals, the favourites Hungary beat Brazil 4–2 in one of the most violent matches in football history, which became infamous as the Battle of Berne. Meanwhile, the World Cup holders Uruguay sent England out of the tournament, also by 4–2. West Germany dispatched Yugoslavia 2–0, and Austria beat the host nation Switzerland in the game that saw the most goals in any World Cup match, 7–5.

In the first semi-final, West Germany beat Austria 6–1.

The other semi-final, one of the most exciting games of the tournament, saw Hungary go into the second half leading Uruguay 1–0, only for the game to be taken to extra time with a score after 90 minutes of 2–2. The deadlock was broken by Sándor Kocsis with two late goals to take Hungary through to the final, with Uruguay finally losing their unbeaten record in World Cup Final matches. Uruguay then went on to be beaten for a second time as Austria secured third place.

Final: "The Miracle of Bern"

The Wankdorf Stadion in Berne saw 60,000 people cram inside to watch the final between West Germany and Hungary, a rematch of a first-round game, which Hungary had won 8–3 against the reserves of the German team. The Golden Team of the Hungarians were favourites, as they were unbeaten for a record of 32 consecutive matches, but they had had two tough knockout matches. It started raining on match day – in Germany this was dubbed Fritz-Walter-Wetter ("Fritz Walter's weather") because the West German team captain Fritz Walter was said to play his best in the rain. Adi Dassler had provided shoes with exchangeable studs.

Hungary's Ferenc Puskás played again in the final, even though he was not fully fit. Despite this he put his team ahead after only six minutes and with Zoltán Czibor adding another two minutes later it seemed that the pre-tournament favourites would take the title. However, with a quick goal from Max Morlock in the 10th and the equaliser of Helmut Rahn in the 19th, the tide began to turn.

The second half saw telling misses by the Hungarian team. Barely six minutes before the end of the match, the popular German radio reporter Herbert Zimmermann gave the most famous German piece of commentary, recommending that "Rahn should shoot from deep", which he did. The second goal from Rahn gave West Germany a 3–2 lead while the Hungarian reporter György Szepesi burst into tears. Later, Zimmermann called Puskás offside before he kicked the ball into Toni Turek's net with 2 minutes left. While referee Ling pointed to the centre spot, linesman Griffiths signalled offside. After a one-minute consultation, referee Ling disallowed the claimed equaliser.

The West Germans were handed the Jules Rimet Trophy and the title of World Cup winners, while the crowd sang along to the tune of the national anthem of West Germany (a scandal broke because the first stanza was sung, the atmosphere became tense). In Germany the success is known as "The Miracle of Berne", upon which a 2003 film of the same name was based. For the Hungarians, the defeat was a disaster, and remains controversial due to claimed referee errors and claims of doping.

One controversy concerns the 2–2 equaliser. Hungarian goalie Gyula Grosics jumped to catch Fritz Walter's corner shot, but in plain sight of the camera, Hans Schäfer obstructed him, and so the ball reached Rahn unhindered. The second controversy concerns allegations of doping to explain the better condition of the West German team in the second half. Though teammates steadfastly denied this rumour, German historian Guido Knopp claimed in a 2004 documentary for German public channel ZDF that the players were injected with shots of vitamin C at half-time, using a needle earlier taken from a Soviet sports doctor, which would also explain the wave of jaundice among team members following the tournament. A Leipzig University study in 2010 posited that the West German players had been injected with the banned substance methamphetamine.

Most controversial was the offside ruling for Puskás's intended 87th-minute equaliser. The camera filming the official footage was in a bad position to judge the situation, but eyewitnesses claimed that the referee was wrong, including West German substitute player Alfred Pfaff. However, since then, unofficial footage surfaced evidencing no offside (shown on North German regional public channel NDR in 2004.)

Records
The following all-time records were set or equalled at this tournament, and have not subsequently been surpassed:

All matches in one tournament
 highest average goals per game (5.38)

Team records for one tournament
 most goals scored (Hungary, 27)
 highest average goals scored per game (Hungary, 5.4)
 highest aggregate goal difference (Hungary, +17)
 highest average goal difference per game (Hungary, +3.4)
 most goals scored, champions (West Germany, 25)
 most average goals scored per game, champions (West Germany, 4.17)
 most goals conceded, champions (West Germany, 14)
 most average goals conceded per game, champions (West Germany, 2.33)
 most goals conceded (South Korea, 16)
 lowest aggregate goal difference (South Korea, −16)
 most average goals conceded per game (South Korea, 8, tied with Bolivia 1950)
 lowest average goal difference per game (South Korea, −8.0, tied with Bolivia 1950).

Records for a single game
 most goals in a single game (both teams) (Austria 7 Switzerland 5)
 greatest margin of victory in a single game (Hungary 9 South Korea 0) (subsequently equalled by Yugoslavia winning 9–0 against Zaire in 1974 and again Hungary winning 10–1 against El Salvador in 1982).

Other landmarks
For the first time there was television coverage, and special coins were issued to mark the event.

The 11 goals scored by Kocsis of Hungary not only led the World Cup but bettered the previous record (set by Brazilian Ademir in the previous tournament) by three goals. Kocsis' mark was broken by Just Fontaine's 13 goals in 1958. Despite not winning the 1954 tournament, their fourth-place finish and their two previous World Cup titles made Uruguay the most successful World Cup nation for eight years, until Brazil won their second title in 1962. Hungary's 9–0 win against Korea during the group stages remains the biggest margin of victory in FIFA World Cup history, later equalled by Yugoslavia over Zaire (9–0) in 1974 and Hungary over El Salvador (10–1) in 1982.

West Germany also became the first team to win the World Cup after having lost a match at the finals (losing 8–3 to Hungary in the group stage). This feat was subsequently repeated by West Germany in 1974, Argentina in 1978 and Spain in 2010, who all lost group matches 1–0 (coincidentally, all three teams won against the Netherlands in the final), as well as by Argentina in 2022, who lost a group match 2-1 against Saudi Arabia.

West Germany's 1954 victory remains the only time that a team has won the World Cup without playing any team from outside its own continent (Turkey is geographically more in Asia compared to Europe, but qualified from Europe's qualification zone and has always been affiliated with UEFA).

West Germany's victory in the final is considered one of the greatest upsets of all time and one of the finest achievements in German sporting history. The West German team was made up of amateur players, as Germany did not have a professional league at this time, while the Hungarians were de jure amateurs, like all the communist countries at that time, but playing football as professionals, mainly for Budapesti Honvéd FC and later for major clubs like Real Madrid and Barcelona in Spain, and were ranked best in the world. This is the only time a team has won the World Cup with amateur footballers.

Venues
Six venues in six cities (1 venue in each city) hosted the tournament's 26 matches. The most used stadium was the St. Jakob Stadium in Basel, which hosted 6 matches. The venues in Bern, Zurich and Lausanne each hosted 5 matches, the venue in Geneva hosted 4 matches, and the venue in Lugano only hosted 1 match.

Squads

The 16 finalists named squads of 22 for the finals, though South Korea only named 20 players in their squad. Unlike recent tournaments, there were no requirements for teams to name three goalkeepers; most teams did, but 6 did not. Some teams also chose to leave some of their named squad at home, only bringing them to Switzerland if necessary.

Match officials 

  Raymon Wyssling
  Benjamin Griffiths
  Charlie Faultless
  Manuel Asensi
  José Vieira da Costa
  Raymond Vincenti
  William Ling
  Esteban Marino
  Arthur Edward Ellis
  Laurent Franken
  Vincenzo Orlandini
  Vasa Stefanović
  Mário Vianna
  Emil Schmetzer
  Carl Erich Steiner
  István Zsolt

Group stage
All times listed are local time (CET, UTC+1).

Group 1

Group 2

Play-off

Group 3

Group 4

Play-off

Knockout stage

Bracket

Quarter-finals

Semi-finals

Third place play-off

Final

Goalscorers

With 11 goals, Sándor Kocsis was the top scorer in the tournament. In total, 140 goals were scored by 63 players, with four of them credited as own goals.

11 goals

 Sándor Kocsis

6 goals

 Erich Probst
 Josef Hügi
 Max Morlock

4 goals

 Nándor Hidegkuti
 Ferenc Puskás
 Robert Ballaman
 Carlos Borges
 Helmut Rahn
 Hans Schäfer
 Ottmar Walter

3 goals

 Ernst Stojaspal
 Theodor Wagner
 Léopold Anoul
 Nat Lofthouse
 Zoltán Czibor
 Burhan Sargun
 Suat Mamat
 Juan Hohberg
 Óscar Míguez
 Fritz Walter

2 goals

 Alfred Körner
 Ernst Ocwirk
 Didi
 Julinho
 Pinga
 Ivor Broadis
 Mihály Lantos
 Péter Palotás
 Lefter Küçükandonyadis
 Julio Abbadie
 Juan Alberto Schiaffino

1 goal

 Henri Coppens
 Baltazar
 Djalma Santos
 Tom Finney
 Jimmy Mullen
 Dennis Wilshaw
 Raymond Kopa
 Jean Vincent
 József Tóth
 Giampiero Boniperti
 Amleto Frignani
 Carlo Galli
 Benito Lorenzi
 Fulvio Nesti
 Egisto Pandolfini
 Tomás Balcázar
 José Luis Lamadrid
 Jacques Fatton
 Mustafa Ertan
 Erol Keskin
 Javier Ambrois
 Obdulio Varela
 Richard Herrmann
 Bernhard Klodt
 Alfred Pfaff
 Miloš Milutinović
 Branko Zebec

1 own goal

 Jimmy Dickinson (playing against Belgium)
 Raúl Cárdenas (playing against France)
 Luis Cruz (playing against Austria)
 Ivica Horvat (playing against West Germany)

FIFA retrospective ranking
In 1986, FIFA published a report that ranked all teams in each World Cup up to and including 1986, based on progress in the competition, overall results and quality of the opposition. The rankings for the 1954 tournament were as follows:

In film 
The final scene of Rainer Werner Fassbinder's film The Marriage of Maria Braun takes place during the finals of the 1954 World Cup; in the scene's background, the sports announcer is celebrating West Germany's victory and shouting "Deutschland ist wieder was!" (Germany is something again); the film uses this as the symbol of Germany's recovery from the ravages of the Second World War.

Sönke Wortmann's 2003 German box-office hit The Miracle of Bern (in German: Das Wunder von Bern) re-tells the story of the German team's route to victory through the eyes of a young boy who admires the key player of the final, Helmut Rahn.

References

External links

1954 FIFA World Cup Switzerland , FIFA.com
Details at RSSSF

 
1954
1954
World Cup
June 1954 sports events in Europe
July 1954 sports events in Europe